A nail clipper (also called nail clippers, a nail trimmer, a nail cutter or nipper type) is a hand tool used to trim fingernails, toenails and hangnails.

Design

Nail clippers are usually made of stainless steel but can also be made of plastic and aluminum. Two common varieties are the plier type and the compound lever type. Many nail clippers usually come with a miniature file fixed to it to allow rough edges of nails to be manicured. Nail clippers occasionally come with a nail catcher. The nail clipper consists of a head that may be concave or convex. Specialized nail clippers which have convex clipping ends are intended for trimming toenails, while concave clipping ends are for fingernails. The cutting head may be manufactured to be parallel or perpendicular to the principal axis of the cutter. Cutting heads that are parallel to the principal axis are made to address accessibility issues involved with cutting toenails.

History

 
Before the invention of the modern nail clipper, people would use small knives to trim or pare their nails. Descriptions of nail trimming in literature date as far back as the 8th century BC. The Book of Deuteronomy exhorts in 21:12 that a man, should he wish to take a captive as a wife, "shall bring her home to [his] house, and she shall shave her head and trim her nails". A reference is made in Horace's Epistles, written circa 20 BC, to "A close-shaven man, it's said, in an empty barber's booth, penknife in hand, quietly cleaning his nails."

The first United States patent for an improvement in a finger-nail clipper was filed in 1875 by Valentine Fogerty. Other subsequent patents for an improvement in finger-nail clippers are those in 1876 by William C. Edge, and in 1878 by John H. Hollman. Filings for finger-nail clippers include, in 1881, those of Eugene Heim and Celestin Matz, in 1885 by George H. Coates (for a finger-nail cutter), and in 1905 by Chapel S. Carter with a later patent in 1922. Around 1913, Carter was secretary of the H. C. Cook Company in Ansonia, Connecticut, which was incorporated in 1903 as the H. C. Cook Machine Company by Henry C. Cook, Lewis I. Cook, and Chapel S. Carter. Around 1928, Carter was president of the company when he claimed, about 1896, the "Gem"-brand fingernail clipper was introduced.

In 1947, William E. Bassett (who started the W. E. Bassett Company in 1939) developed the "Trim"-brand nail clipper, using the superior jaw-style design that had been around since the 19th century, but adding two nibs near the base of the file to prevent lateral movement, replacing the pinned rivet with a notched rivet, and adding a thumb-swerve in the lever.

See also
 Cigar cutter
 Dog grooming#Nail clipping
 Manicure
 Pedicure
 Pliers

References

External links

Mechanical hand tools
Nail care
Cutting tools
Domestic implements
Toiletry
Medical equipment
19th-century inventions